The 1967 Five Nations Championship was the thirty-eighth series of the rugby union Five Nations Championship. Including the previous incarnations as the Home Nations and Five Nations, this was the seventy-third series of the northern hemisphere rugby union championship. Ten matches were played between 14 January and 15 April. It was contested by England, France, Ireland, Scotland and Wales. France won their fourth title, with a single loss.

Participants
The teams involved were:

Table

(Source: rugbyfootballhistory.com:)

Squads

Results

Source for match results and dates:

References

External links

The official RBS Six Nations Site

Six Nations Championship seasons
Five Nations
Five Nations
Five Nations
Five Nations
Five Nations
Five Nations
 
Five Nations
Five Nations
Five Nations
Five Nations